Idril may refer to:
 Idril Celebrindal, a pivotal character in "The Fall of Gondolin" story within J. R. R Tolkien's legendarium.
 a supporting non player character in the 2017 video game Middle-earth: Shadow of War.
 Idrial, a playable character in the 2004 video game The Lord of the Rings: The Third Age.